Transverse lesion is a generic term for the two kinds of paralysis:
Paraplegia, caused by damage in range of the thoracic vertebrae
Tetraplegia, caused by damage in range of the cervical vertebrae

de:Querschnittsyndrom